Languriomiccolamia bicolor is a species of beetle in the family Cerambycidae, and the only species in the genus Languriomiccolamia. It was described by Matsuo & Yamasako in 2011.

References

Desmiphorini
Monotypic beetle genera

Beetles described in 2011